Ypsilon is another name for the Greek letter upsilon (υ / Υ)

The spelling Ypsilon may also refer to:

 Lancia Ypsilon, a car
 Ypsilon (bridge), a bridge in Norway
 Ypsilon, Kyrgia, Doxato, Drama, Greece; a village 
 Ypsilon Mountain, a mountain in Colorado, USA
 Ypsilon (Scheme implementation), a software implementation

See also
 Ipsilon (disambiguation)
 Upsilon (disambiguation)